Freeport Township is located in Stephenson County, Illinois. As of the 2010 census, its population was 25,638 and it contained 12,396 housing units. Freeport Township is coterminous with City of Freeport. It is one of seventeen coterminous townships in Illinois.

Geography

Stagecoach inns
The Mansion House hotel on Walnut Street and Spring Streets in Freeport was built by Benjamin Goddard in 1838. It was an official stage stop on the Old State Road number 2, now Business U.S. Route 20, for the Frink, Walker & Company stage line Chicago to Galena 1839–1854. The building is no longer standing.

Demographics

References

External links
City-data.com
Stephenson County Official Site

Townships in Stephenson County, Illinois
Rockford metropolitan area, Illinois
Townships in Illinois